The 2022–23 FIU Panthers men's basketball team represented Florida International University in the 2022–23 NCAA Division I men's basketball season. The Panthers, led by fifth-year head coach Jeremy Ballard, played their home games at Ocean Bank Convocation Center in Miami, Florida as members of Conference USA.

Previous season
The Panthers finished the 2021–22 season 15–17, 5–13 in C-USA play to finish in sixth place in East Division. Their lost in the first round of the C-USA tournament to Marshall.

Offseason

Departures

Incoming transfers

2022 recruiting class

Roster

Schedule and results

|-
!colspan=9 style=| Regular season

|-
!colspan=9 style=| Conference USA tournament

Source

References

FIU Panthers men's basketball seasons
FIU Panthers
FIU Panthers men's basketball
FIU Panthers men's basketball